A banquette is a small footpath or elevated step along the inside of a rampart or parapet of a fortification.  Musketeers atop it were able to view the counterscarp, or fire on enemies in the moat. A typical size is a foot and a half (approximately half a metre) high, and almost three feet (approximately 90 cm) wide.

See also
 List of established military terms

References
 

Castle architecture